The 2022 Valorant Champions was an esports tournament for the video game Valorant. This was the second edition of the Valorant Champions, the crowning event of the Valorant Champions Tour (VCT) for the 2022 Valorant competitive season. The tournament was held from August 31 to September 18, 2022, in Istanbul, Turkey.

"Fire Again" was the tournament's theme song, put together by Ashnikko.

Acend were the defending champions, but failed to qualify for the event after losing to G2 Esports in the VCT 2022: EMEA Last Chance Qualifier.

LOUD won the Valorant world championship after defeating OpTic Gaming in the finals by a score of 3–1.

Venues
Istanbul was the city chosen to host the competition. The tournament was held at the Volkswagen Arena Istanbul, with spectators from knockout stage.

Qualified teams
Sixteen teams qualified for the global crowning event of the circuit, with ten teams qualifying through points earned throughout the season, while the remaining six teams qualified via the Last Chance Qualifiers. The following teams qualified for the event:

Group stage
The group stage took place August 31 – September 8, 2022. All 16 teams were divided into 4 groups of four teams each playing in a GSL-style double-elimination format. Games were held in a best-of-three series. Only the top 2 teams in each group will qualified for the playoffs.

Group A

Group B

Group C

Group D

Knockout stage
The knockouts were a double-elimination tournament that took place September 9–18, 2022, at Volkswagen Arena, Istanbul. All matches were a best-of-three series, except for the Lower Bracket Final and the Grand Final, which were a best-of-five series.

Prize pool

Notes

References

Valorant competitions
2022 first-person shooter tournaments